Anton Oberbeck (25 March 1846 – 23 October 1900) was a German physicist from Berlin.

He studied at Heidelberg and the University of Berlin, obtaining his doctorate from the latter in 1868. From 1870 to 1878 he was a teacher at Sophien-Realgymnasium in Berlin, during which time, he participated in the Franco-Prussian War (1870–71). He lectured at Halle and Karlsruhe and conducted research at the University of Greifswald (1885–1895), and later at the University of Tübingen.

Published works 
 Über die sogenannte Magnetisirungskonstante, 1868 (graduate thesis) – On the so-called magnetic constant.
 Über eine Methode, die Leitungsfähigkeit von Flüssigkeiten für Electricität zu bestimmen, 1874 – On a method for determining the conductivity of liquids involving electricity.
 Ueber stationäre Flüssigkeitsbewegungen mit Berücksichtigung der inneren Reibung. J. reine angew. Math. 81 (1876) 62–80.
 Über die Fortpflanzung der magnetischen Induction im weichen Eisen, 1878 (habilitation thesis) – On the propagation of magnetic induction in soft iron.
 Über die Bewegungen der Luft an der Erdoberfläche, 1882 – On the movements of air at the surface.
 Über die Bewegungserscheinungen der Atmosphaere, 1888 – On the phenomena of motion of the atmosphere.
 Über Licht und Leuchten, 1895 – On lighting and lamps.
 Ueber den Verlauf der electrischen Schwingungen bei den Tesla’schen Versuchen. Annalen der Physik und Chemie, Vol. 55, 1895. – About the behavior of electrical oscillations in the Tesla experiments.

References 

1846 births
1900 deaths
19th-century German physicists
Scientists from Berlin
People from the Province of Brandenburg
Humboldt University of Berlin alumni
Heidelberg University alumni
Academic staff of the Martin Luther University of Halle-Wittenberg
Academic staff of the Karlsruhe Institute of Technology
Academic staff of the University of Greifswald
Academic staff of the University of Tübingen